Skuse is a surname. Notable people with the surname include:

Cole Skuse (born 1986), English footballer 
Frederick A. Askew Skuse ( 1863–1896), British-Australian entomologist
Janet 'Rusty' Skuse (1943–2007), most tattooed woman in Britain
Jean Skuse (born 1932), Australian Christian church official
Sarah Skuse (born 1974), British entrepreneur